Dimitrovgrad is a town in Haskovo Province, Bulgaria. It is along the Maritsa River in the Thrace region, close to the provincial capital, Haskovo. Dimitrovgrad  is the administrative centre of Dimitrovgrad Municipality.

Founded in 1947, Dimitrovgrad is a planned city built by the People's Republic of Bulgaria following World War II. The recently established communist government designed the town as a socialist model city and a modern industrial center. Dimitrovgrad is named for the first communist leader of Bulgaria, Georgi Dimitrov.

Geography 
It is located 220 km from the capital Sofia and 15 km from the regional town of Haskovo. The nearest Bulgarian port is Burgas - 205 km, and the Greek port of Alexandroupoli on the Aegean Sea is about 190 km. through Makaza. Dimitrovgrad is a transport hub for Pan-European corridors 4, 8 and 9.

History
Dimitrovgrad was planned by the People's Republic of Bulgaria, the communist state that came to power following World War II.

Construction of the city began on May 10, 1947, with most of the labor provided by youth volunteers who arrived from around Bulgaria. The establishment of Dimitrovgrad was officially announced on 2 September 1947, by Georgi Dimitrov, the leader of the People's Republic of Bulgaria. The three villages of Rakovski, Mariyno and Chernokonyovo were merged to form Dimitrovgrad. Construction of the town continued intensively for several more years.

The main practical reason behind the new city was to create a modern industrial centre for Bulgaria. there was also an ideological foundation for building it. The widespread destruction in Eastern Europe caused by World War II and the rise of Soviet-backed communist states in the region (known as the Eastern Bloc) led to numerous cities being built or rebuilt using new socialist planning styles. The original buildings in Dimitrovgrad were built in architectural styles popularly known as "Soviet Empire" or "Stalin Baroque", with facades of the earliest often monumental, with plinths, large columns and small decorative balconies. Over time, as the town expanded, buildings were built featuring less ornamentation in the newer Modernist architectural style.

In 1970, the first celebration of the national poetry festival 'Penio Penev' took place, and that tradition continues to the present. In 1980, the biennial Bulgarian theatrical poster was held for the first time. In 1987, the museum house Penio Penev was opened.

In 1992, shortly after the collapse of communism in Bulgaria, the monument to Georgi Dimitrov was removed by the authorities. This move proved very unpopular with the local residents, and in 2012 a plan was adopted by Dimitrovgrad city council to restore the statue and re-mount it by 2013. So far this has not happened.

Tourism

Architecture in Dimitrovgrad is similar to that of the Roman Empire: It has spacious streets and large parks. It is one of the greenest cities in Bulgaria. There are three large parks with about 15 lakes, dozens of species of rare trees, shrubs and flowers, sculptures, gazebos and fountains. The town is also home to the People's Astronomical Observatory and Planetarium "Jordano Bruno". This is the first planetarium and second observatory (after the one in Stara Zagora) in Bulgaria

Population 
The population of Dimitrovgrad during the first decade after its foundation averaged about 34,000. In the following decades it started growing, mostly because of migrants from rural areas, reaching its peak between 1985 and 1992, when it exceeded 50,000. Since then, particularly during the 1990s, the population declined rapidly due to the poor economic situation in the region that lead to a new migration to the country's capital Sofia and abroad.

Notable people 
 Atanas Kapralov, poet
 Nadezhda Aleksieva (b. 1969), biathlete
 Krassimira Banova, basketball player, European champion
 Atanas Vishanov, artist
 Vasil Gyuzelev, professor, historian
 Joanna Kristeva, author, psychologist
 Doncho Donev, football player
 Found Klinchev, musician
 Vanya Kostova, singer
 Duet Mania, singers
 Hristo Markov, world and Olympic champion in triple jump, athletics
 Zdravko Neychev, artist
 Rumen Radev, President of the Republic of Bulgaria (2017-)
 Vezhdi Rashidov, artist, Minister of Culture (2009–13, 2014–17)
 Krassimir Rusev, chess player
 Vasil Sgurev, academician, cybernetician
 Elin Topuzakov, football player
 Petko Churchuliev, artist
Gergana, Bulgarian pop-folk singer
Vladislav Panev, politician and economist

Twin towns – sister cities

Dimitrovgrad is twinned with:

 Blida, Algeria
 Darkhan, Mongolia
 Dimitrovgrad, Russia
 Eisenhüttenstadt, Germany
 Grosseto, Italy
 Jiaojiang (Taizhou), China
 Kalamaria, Greece
 Kazincbarcika, Hungary
 Nowa Huta (Kraków), Poland
 Yuzhne, Ukraine

References

External links

 Official website of Dimitrovgrad municipality
 Portal website of Dimitrovgrad
 Website of National Community Center "Vasil Levsky 2003", Dimitrovgrad

 
Socialist planned cities
Populated places in Haskovo Province
Populated places established in 1947
Georgi Dimitrov
1947 establishments in Bulgaria